Tubusin Mo ng Bala ang Puso Ko is a 1996 Philippine action film co-edited and directed by Toto Natividad The film stars Edu Manzano and Anjanette Abayari.

Cast
 Edu Manzano as Lorenzo
 Anjanette Abayari as Kate
 Mark Gil as Frank
 Bembol Roco as Lt. Miranda
 Jeanette Fernando as Karen
 Ronaldo Valdez as Alfredo
 Perla Bautista as Kate's Mother
 Pocholo Montes as Kate's Father
 Archi Adamos as Benjie
 Dexter Doria as Manghuhula
 Roldan Aquino as Edward
 Danny Labra as Resthouse Caretaker
 Judy Teodoro as Kate's Friend

References

External links

1996 films
1996 action films
Filipino-language films
Philippine action films
GMA Pictures films
OctoArts Films films
Films directed by Toto Natividad